Amaud Jamaul Johnson (born 1972) is an American poet. He is the Arthur M. and Fanny M. Dole Professor of English at Pomona College in Claremont, California.

Early life 
Johnson grew up in Compton, California.

Career 
Johnson has authored three poetry collections, Red Summer, Darktown Follies, and Imperial Liquor.

In July 2022, he was appointed the Arthur M. and Fanny M. Dole Professor of English at Pomona College, an endowed chair.

References

External links
Faculty page at Pomona College

1972 births
Living people
Pomona College faculty
People from Compton, California
20th-century American poets
21st-century American poets